Minute for Murder is a 1947 crime novel by Cecil Day-Lewis, written under the pen name of Nicholas Blake. It is the eighth in a series of novels featuring the private detective Nigel Strangeways, and the first published following the Second World War. The hero begins the film employed at the Ministry of Morale, modelled on the Ministry of Information that Day-Lewis had worked for during wartime.

References

Bibliography
 Stanford, Peter. C Day-Lewis: A Life. A&C Black, 2007.

1947 British novels
Novels by Cecil Day-Lewis
British crime novels
Collins Crime Club books
Novels set in London
British detective novels